The Monterey County Trust & Savings Building, also known as China Art Center, is a historic Spanish Mission Revival commercial building in Carmel-by-the-Sea, California. It was designed by architects H. H. Winner Co., of San Francisco and built in 1929–1930, by Hugh W. Comstock and Michael J. Murphy. It was designated as an important commercial building in the city's Downtown Historic District Property Survey on October 18, 2002.

History
The building is a large two-story concrete rectangular commercial building with an overhanging Spanish tiled gabled roof and quatrefoil window in the apex. It is located on Dolores Street and Seventh Avenue. The lower exterior was constructed with Carmel stone with wrought iron display windows railings. It has a large arched entryway with a carved wooden gate at the entryway. The entrance foyer has a wrought iron lighting fixture. The design is similar to other California missions. Jo Mora did most of the artwork including the bas-relief outside and paintings inside. Inside are historic wooden beams and figures.

The building qualified for inclusion in the Downtown Historic District Property Survey because it is an example of the Spanish Mission Revival style designed in 1929 by architects H. H. Winner Co., of San Francisco, which specialized in banks, and built by Hugh W. Comstock and Michael J. Murphy. The building also represents Comstock's building style change from fairy tale houses to commercial banking construction and design.

On April 26, 1930, an ad was place in the local newspapers announcing the completion and opening of the new "banking home" in Carmel-by-the-Sea. The bank had a head office in Salinas and branches in Gonzales, King City, Carmel-by-the-Sea, and Castroville, California.

The bank was created by pioneers in the early development of Salinas and Monterey County after the Gold Rush. In 1930, assets of the bank were $7,090,143.18. The board of directors of the bank were A. C. Hughes (president), H. E. Abbot, Chapman Foster, L. W. Sanborn, H. F. Dickinson, George P. Henry, L. A. Wilder, E. E. Hitchcock, and J. J. Gross.

The bank building became the Carmel Museum of Art in September 1967, dedicated to the "collection, preservation and presentation of works of art and original research material." At that time, the building was remodeled and the bank equipment and counters removed. Comstock did the work. It was then owned by Frances and Joan Chew in the 1970s as the China Art Center. On March 27, 1971, the China Art Center had its grand opening. In June 1986, The China Art Center redid the roof. The China Art Center building was closed in 2017.

The building's Mission and Spanish Revival design is similar to El Paseo Building, Kocher Building, and the Isable Leidig Building, all located on Dolores Street between Ocean Avenue and 7th Street.

H. H. Winner & Co.
Henry H. Winner (1874-1962) of H. H. Winner & Co., was in San Francisco. They were experts in bank construction and planning. They constructed a number of banks in California, including the Bank of Los Banos (1922), Bank of Napa (1923), and the Sonoma County and Savings Bank (1925).

H. H. Winner also designed the Spanish Revival style Monterey branch of the Monterey County Trust and Savings Bank in 1931, that is now occupied by Wells Fargo on Alvarado and Franklin Streets in Monterey, California. M. J. Murphy was the builder.

See also
 Spanish Colonial Revival architecture

References

External links

 Downtown Conservation District Historic Property Survey
 Historic China Art Center in Carmel
 Historical Context Statement Carmel-by-the-Sea

1930 establishments in California
Carmel-by-the-Sea, California
Buildings and structures in Monterey County, California
Spanish Colonial Revival architecture in California